Darlene Joyce Zschech (née Steinhardt on 8 September 1965) is an Australian Pentecostal Christian worship leader and singer-songwriter who primarily writes praise and worship songs. Described as a pioneer of the modern worship movement, she is the former worship pastor of Hillsong Church and currently a member of Compassionart, a charity founded by Martin Smith.

Life and career
Zschech starred on television at the age of ten, as part of an Australian children's show, Happy Go Round. When she was 13, her parents divorced and the emotional stress of being on television and her parents' divorce resulted in her having bulimia for about four years.

In 1980, when Zschech was 15, her father rededicated his life to Christ and began taking her to church, where she also became a committed Christian and met her future husband, Mark Zschech. When they married, her husband suggested that they move from Brisbane to Sydney, which was confirmed at a small church they were visiting one Sunday when the guest speaker said in the middle of his sermon, "This doesn't happen to me very often, but whatever it is you two prayed last night, God says to do it now." They began attending Hills Christian Life Centre, which would become Hillsong Church.

Zschech sang jingles for several international companies including McDonald's, KFC and Coca-Cola. She released Make the Choice in 1987 and Pearls & Gold in 1993. She eventually joined the staff of Hillsong Church after penning "Shout to the Lord" in 1993. When she presented it to Hillsong's then-worship pastor, Geoff Bullock, she was so embarrassed that she requested he face away from her as she played and sang. It was first recorded on People Just Like Us and has appeared on more than 200 different albums by numerous artists in multiple languages. It is also the title track for the first live album co-produced with Integrity Music featuring Zschech as a worship leader. It was Integrity Music's first album to feature a female worship leader. The album was nominated for Praise & Worship Album of the Year at the 1997 Dove Awards. The song was nominated in the 1998 Dove Awards' Song of the Year category. It has been performed for the Pope at the Vatican and for the President of the United States. The song has become one of the most well-known modern worship songs, being sung by an estimated 25–30 million churchgoers every Sunday since the song's release. She wrote the song during a time of personal struggle. 

Shout to the Lord, the album, was nominated as Album of the Year for the 1997 Dove Awards and Song of the Year for the 1998 Dove Awards. In 2000, Zschech received a Dove Award nomination for Songwriter of the Year and received the International Award for influence in praise and worship.

Zschech was the worship pastor of Hillsong Church from 1996 to 2007, during which time she served as producer, vocal producer or executive producer for more than 20 albums under the Hillsong Music label and wrote more than 80 published worship songs. Under Zschech's leadership, the album People Just Like Us (1994) was the first Christian album in Australia to be certified gold and platinum, and the album For All You've Done (2004) debuted at No. 1 on the Australian Record Industry Association album charts.

In 2003, Zschech released her first official solo album, Kiss of Heaven. Change Your World followed in 2005. She has since released two albums, in 2011, called Simply Darlene and You Are Love. In addition to writing songs, she has written five books: Worship (1996), Extravagant Worship (2002), The Kiss of Heaven (2003), The Great Generational Transition (2009) and Revealing Jesus: A 365-Day Devotional (2013).

On 11 December 2013, Zschech announced that she had been diagnosed with breast cancer. In a blog dated 30 November 2014, she wrote that she has been healed of cancer, which her doctor called miraculous.

Personal life 

Zschech and her husband have three daughters.

Discography
The following is a list by year of albums or single tracks which feature Zschech as a prominent vocalist or worship leader.

See also
 List of Hillsong albums

Notes and references

External links
 
 

1965 births
Living people
Australian Charismatics
Australian women singer-songwriters
Australian gospel singers
Australian Pentecostals
Christian music songwriters
Fair Trade Services artists
Hillsong musicians
Performers of contemporary worship music
Singers from Sydney
20th-century Australian women singers
21st-century Australian women singers